Eromo Egbejule is a Nigerian journalist, writer and filmmaker. He is known mostly for his work on the Boko Haram insurgency and other conflicts in West and Central Africa. He is currently Africa Editor at Al Jazeera English Online.

Background 
Egbejule was born in Sapele in the southernmost part of Nigeria.  He has degrees in engineering, media and communications and data journalism from the University of Nigeria, Nsukka, University of Leicester and Columbia University respectively.

Writing career 
He started as a music journalist, writing for local Nigerian papers like The Guardian (Nigeria), ThisDay, NEXT and YNaija. In 2014, he covered the ebola crisis in Liberia for local Nigerian media, but later that year began working as a freelance reporter and stringer for foreign media on music and culture. Since then, he has reported extensively on the Boko Haram insurgency, elections across West Africa, sustainability in the Peruvian Amazon, Sino-African relations in the Horn of Africa and other themes. In a 2017 interview, he is quoted to have said his writing style focuses on 'rotating the cube', rather than recycling reporting tropes on Africa.

His writing and photography have appeared in The Atlantic, The Guardian (UK), Al-Jazeera,  New York Times, Financial Times, Washington Post, Frankfurter Allgemeine Zeitung, Thomson Reuters Foundation, Premium Times, Telegraph (UK), The Times and more. In 2020, he joined OZY as its Africa Editor, just months after leaving his role as West Africa Editor for The Africa Report magazine (2018-2019). In 2022, he joined Al Jazeera English as its Africa Editor.

In fall 2019, he was named one of four Dag Hammarsjköld Journalism Fellows at the United Nations Headquarters in New York for his work in covering 'husband schools' in rural Sierra Leone, setup to combat gender-based violence in the country. His narrative nonfiction has also been shortlisted for the 2019 Miles Morland Foundation Writing Scholarship for narrative nonfiction. He has been described as "one of the country’s most important storytellers".

Egbejule has also made intermittent incursions into academics, having been a visiting lecturer and researcher to Malmö University, Sweden across February 2017. He has also taught lectures and seminar classes at the University of Copenhagen, Linnaeus University, Växjö and New York University on among other things, his coverage of the insurgency in the Sahel and Anglophone crisis in Cameroon. In 2014, he was a recipient of the Prince Claus travel grant  for culture and development, to facilitate a short teaching spell in Mexico.

See also 

 List of Nigerian writers

References 

1990 births
Living people
21st-century essayists
Nigerian journalists
English-language writers from Nigeria
People from Delta State
University of Nigeria alumni
Alumni of the University of Leicester